The 2017–18 Iranian Futsal Super League are the 19th season of the Iran Pro League and the 14th under the name Futsal Super League. Giti Pasand are the defending champions. The season will feature 12 teams from the 2016–17 Super League and two new teams promoted from the 2016–17 1st Division: Atoliyeh Tehran and Moghavemat Qarchak.

Teams

Stadia, locations and Personnel 

1 Yasin Pishro Renamed to Heyat Football.

Number of teams by region

League standings 
</noinclude><noinclude>

Positions by round

Results table

Clubs season-progress

Awards 

 Winner: Mes Sungun
 Runners-up: Tasisat Daryaei
 Third-Place: Giti Pasand
 Top scorer:  Mahdi Javid (Tasisat Daryaei) (35 goals)
 Best Player:  Mahdi Javid
 Best Manager:  Hamid Bigham (Mes Sungun)
 Best Goalkeeper:  Alireza Samimi (Mes Sungun)
 Best Team: Mes Sungun
 Fairplay Man:  Sepehr Mohammadi (Giti Pasand)
 Best Referee: Mahmoud Nasirlou

See also 
 2017–18 Iran Futsal's 1st Division
 2018 Futsal's 2nd Division
 2017–18 Persian Gulf Cup
 2017–18 Azadegan League
 2017–18 Iran Football's 2nd Division
 2017–18 Iran Football's 3rd Division
 2017–18 Hazfi Cup
 2017 Iranian Super Cup

References

External links 
 Iran Futsal League on PersianLeague 
 Futsal Planet 

Iranian Futsal Super League seasons
1